The 2020 Magnolia Hotshots season was the 32nd season of the franchise in the Philippine Basketball Association (PBA).

Key dates
December 8: The 2019 PBA draft took place in Midtown Atrium, Robinson Place Manila.
March 11: The PBA postponed the season due to the threat of the coronavirus.

Draft picks

Roster

Philippine Cup

Eliminations

Standings

Game log

|-bgcolor=ffcccc
| 1
| March 8
| San Miguel
| L 78–94
| Paul Lee (19)
| Jackson Corpuz (13)
| Chris Banchero (6)
| Smart Araneta Coliseum
| 0–1

|-bgcolor=ccffcc
| 2
| October 14
| NLEX
| W 103–100
| Banchero, Jalalon (19)
| Ian Sangalang (10)
| Jio Jalalon (4)
| AUF Sports Arena & Cultural Center
| 1–1
|-bgcolor=ffcccc
| 3
| October 17
| Alaska
| L 81–87
| Mark Barroca (16)
| Reavis, Sangalang (7)
| Mark Barroca (5)
| AUF Sports Arena & Cultural Center
| 1–2
|-bgcolor=ffcccc
| 4
| October 20
| Meralco
| L 104–109 (OT)
| Paul Lee (32)
| Jackson Corpuz (8)
| Chris Banchero (4)
| AUF Sports Arena & Cultural Center
| 1–3
|-bgcolor=ffcccc
| 5
| October 23
| Phoenix
| L 84–91
| Chris Banchero (20)
| Rafi Reavis (10)
| Barroca, Lee (6)
| AUF Sports Arena & Cultural Center
| 1–4
|-bgcolor=ccffcc
| 6
| October 25
| Ginebra
| W 102–92
| Jackson Corpuz (20)
| Ian Sangalang (8)
| Jio Jalalon (10)
| AUF Sports Arena & Cultural Center
| 2–4

|-bgcolor=ccffcc
| 7
| November 4
| TNT
| W 102–92
| Paul Lee (27)
| Ian Sangalang (9)
| Mark Barroca (7)
| AUF Sports Arena & Cultural Center
| 3–4
|-bgcolor=ccffcc
| 8
| November 5
| Terrafirma
| W 103–89
| Paul Lee (29)
| Ian Sangalang (10)
| Banchero, Barroca (7)
| AUF Sports Arena & Cultural Center
| 4–4
|-bgcolor=ccffcc
| 9
| November 7
| Rain or Shine
| W 70–62
| Paul Lee (31)
| Rafi Reavis (11)
| Jio Jalalon (3)
| AUF Sports Arena & Cultural Center
| 5–4
|-bgcolor=ccffcc
| 10
| November 8
| NorthPort
| W 83–76
| Ian Sangalang (23)
| Ian Sangalang (9)
| Paul Lee (8)
| AUF Sports Arena & Cultural Center
| 6–4
|-bgcolor=ccffcc
| 11
| November 11
| Blackwater
| W 95–80
| Ian Sangalang (17)
| Ian Sangalang (10)
| Banchero, Barroca (6)
| AUF Sports Arena & Cultural Center
| 7–4

Playoffs

Bracket

Game log

|-bgcolor=ffcccc
| 1
| November 14
| Phoenix
| L 88–89
| Paul Lee (17)
| Ian Sangalang (11)
| Paul Lee (6)
| AUF Sports Arena & Cultural Center
| 0–1

Transactions

Trades 
Off-season

Free agents

Re-signed

Rookie signings

References

Magnolia Hotshots seasons
Magnolia Hotshots